Rear Admiral Anthony Michael "Gerry" Carwardine AO (born 25 March 1938) is a retired Australian naval officer, Chief of Naval Personnel in the Royal Australian Navy and former Commandant of the Australian Defence Force Academy.

Early life
Carwardine was educated at Newington College (1947–1953), commencing as a preparatory school student in Wyvern House, before entering the Royal Australian Naval College.

Naval career
 Entered – Royal Australian Navy (1954)
 Served – HMA Ships Queenborough, Quiberon, Vendetta, Brisbane, Melbourne, Banks, Gull, and HM Ships Carron and Corunna (1956–1974)
 Commanding Officer – HMAS Swan (1976–1978)
 Director – Naval Data Combat System Centre (1980–1983)
 Commander – HMAS Adelaide (1983–1985)
 Commanding Officer – HMAS Cerberus (1986–1988)
 Naval Officer Commanding – Victoria (1986–1988)
 Chief – Naval Personnel (1988–1990)
 Defence Attache – Washington, D.C. (1991–1992)
 Commandant – Australian Defence Force Academy (1993–1995)

Retirement
Since 1998 Carwardine has been a service member of the Veterans' Review Board, representing the Australian Capital Territory.

Honours
 National Medal (1977) – Awarded for diligent long service to the community in hazardous circumstances in times of emergency and national disaster and in direct protection of life and property
 National Medal, 1st Clasp (1981) – Awarded for diligent long service to the community in hazardous circumstances in times of emergency and national disaster and in direct protection of life and property
 Member, Order of Australia (1986) – In recognition of service to the Royal Australian Navy, particularly as Commanding Officer of HMAS Adelaide
 Officer, Order of Australia (1990) – In recognition of service to the Royal Australian Navy, particularly as the Assistant Chief of Naval Personnel

References

1938 births
Graduates of the Royal Australian Naval College
Living people
Officers of the Order of Australia
People educated at Newington College
Royal Australian Navy admirals